Joseph Hopkins Millard (April 20, 1836January 13, 1922) was a Canadian-American businessman and politician from Nebraska. He served in the United States Senate and as mayor of Omaha, and was an anti-suffrage activist.

Life

Millard was born in Hamilton, Ontario, British Canada. He moved to Iowa with his parents, who settled near Sabula, Iowa. He attended the district school and clerked in a store; Millard moved to Omaha, Nebraska, in 1856 and engaged in the land business. He moved to Montana in 1864; through the assistance of an Iowa capitalist, he opened a bank in Virginia City, Montana. Millard returned to Omaha in 1866 and became director, president, and cashier of the Omaha National Bank; he was one of the incorporators of the Omaha & Northwestern Railroad Company in 1869. He served as the mayor of Omaha in 1872; for fifteen years he was a director of the Union Pacific Railroad Company, six years of which he served in the capacity of a Government director.

Millard was elected as a Republican to the United States Senate, March 28, 1901, to fill the vacancy in the term beginning March 4, 1901, caused by the failure of the Nebraska Legislature to act, and served from March 28, 1901, to March 3, 1907.  During his term he served as chairman of the Committee on Inter-Oceanic Canals (Fifty-ninth Congress); he was not a candidate for reelection in 1906. Millard then resumed the banking business in Omaha.  He died there on January 13, 1922, and was interred in Prospect Hill Cemetery.

Views

Millard headed an organization called Nebraska Men's Association Opposed to Woman Suffrage. His organization opposed allowing women to vote as a part of a broader desire to restrict voting to white men of high social class.

Relatives

His brother, Ezra Millard, also served as mayor of Omaha.  The former village and present-day neighborhood of Millard, Nebraska was named after the brothers.

See also
 Brandeis-Millard House
 List of United States senators born outside the United States

References

1836 births
1922 deaths
Politicians from Hamilton, Ontario
Pre-Confederation Canadian emigrants to the United States
Nebraska Republicans
Republican Party United States senators from Nebraska
Mayors of Omaha, Nebraska
People from Virginia City, Montana
Burials at Prospect Hill Cemetery (North Omaha, Nebraska)